Sabuli is a community in the Jirapa district in Upper West Region of Ghana. Its low altitude of 304 meters above sea level makes it a fertile ground for agriculture purposes. Predominanted by farmers, the community has a total population of 3,190 as of 2006.

References

Communities in Ghana
Populated places in the Upper West Region